Děčín District is a district in the Ústí nad Labem Region of the Czech Republic. Its capital is the city of Děčín.

Administrative division
Děčín District is divided into three administrative districts of municipalities with extended competence: Děčín, Rumburk and Varnsdorf.

List of municipalities
Cities and towns are marked in bold:

Arnoltice -
Benešov nad Ploučnicí -
Bynovec -
Česká Kamenice -
Děčín -
Dobkovice -
Dobrná -
Dolní Habartice -
Dolní Podluží -
Dolní Poustevna -
Doubice -
Františkov nad Ploučnicí -
Heřmanov -
Horní Habartice -
Horní Podluží -
Hřensko -
Huntířov -
Chřibská -
Janov -
Janská -
Jetřichovice -
Jílové -
Jiřetín pod Jedlovou -
Jiříkov -
Kámen -
Krásná Lípa -
Kunratice -
Kytlice -
Labská Stráň -
Lipová -
Lobendava -
Ludvíkovice -
Malá Veleň -
Malšovice -
Markvartice -
Merboltice -
Mikulášovice -
Rumburk -
Růžová -
Rybniště -
Srbská Kamenice -
Staré Křečany -
Starý Šachov -
Šluknov -
Těchlovice -
Valkeřice -
Varnsdorf -
Velká Bukovina -
Velký Šenov -
Verneřice -
Veselé -
Vilémov

Geography

Děčín District borders Germany in the north. It includes the Šluknov Hook area, surrounded by Germany on three sides. The district is a hilly and above-average forested area with several valleys and canyons. The territory extends into four geomorphological mesoregions: Elbe Sandstone Mountains (northwest), Central Bohemian Uplands (south), Lusatian Mountains (east) and Lusatian Highlands (north).

The territory is rich in rivers. The most important river is the Elbe, which flows through the west of the territory and continues to Germany. Its most important tributary is the Ploučnice. Other notable rivers are the Kamenice, Křinice, Sebnice, and Mandava. The Spree shortly forms the Czech-German border.

There are few bodies of water in the district.

Most of the Děčín District is protected within some of large-scale protected areas. The most significant is Bohemian Switzerland National Park with many famous natural monuments. The protected landscape areas of České Středohoří, Labské pískovce and Lužické hory also extend into the district.

Demographics

Most populated municipalities

Economy
The largest employers with its headquarters in Děčín District and at least 500 employers are:

Transport
There are no motorways in the district territory. The most important road that passess through the district is the I/13 from Liberec to Karlovy Vary.

Děčín District is an important junction. An important railway line from Prague to Dresden runs through it. The Elbe is used for ship transport.

Sights

The most important monument in the district and the only one protected as a national cultural monument is Benešov nad Ploučnicí Castle.

The best-preserved settlements and localities, protected as monument reservations and monument zones, are:

Rumburk – Šmilovského Street (monument reservation)
Benešov nad Ploučnicí
Česká Kamenice
Jiřetín pod Jedlovou
Šluknov
Dlouhý Důl
Kamenická Stráň
Merboltice
Vysoká Lípa

The most visited tourist destinations are the Děčín Zoo and places in Bohemian Switzerland, which are also among the most visited nature tourist destinations in the entire country: Kamenice Gorge, Pravčická brána, and Jetřichovice Rocks.

References

External links

Děčín District profile on the Czech Statistical Office's website

 
Districts of the Czech Republic